Maksim Dimitrievski is the incumbent mayor of Kumanovo Municipality. Previously he was a member of the City Council, President of the Council of Kumanovo Municipality, and a member of the Assembly of the Republic of Macedonia.

Early life and career
Maksim Dimitrievski was born on the 29th of November 1975 in Kumanovo. He finished his primary and secondary education in his hometown and graduated from the Faculty of Law of Ss. Cyril and Methodius University of Skopje.

In 2009, he was a member of the Executive Committee of the Social Democratic Union of Macedonia, where he began his political career as a young activist.

In 2021, he was re-elected as Mayor of Kumanovo as an independent candidate.

References

Mayors of Kumanovo
1975 births
Living people
Social Democratic Union of Macedonia politicians
Ss. Cyril and Methodius University of Skopje alumni
Members of the Assembly of North Macedonia